The Hana Bank Invitational is a men's professional golf tournament in South Korea. The 2018 event was held in June on the west course at the Lakeside Country Club near Yongin. Prize money was KRW1,000,000,000. In 2019 the event moved to the nearby 88 Country Club with increased prize money of KRW1,200,000,000.

The field includes a number of invited Japanese and Chinese golfers. A similar event, the "Korea-China Tour KEB Invitational", which included Korean and Chinese golfers, was held six times from 2008 to 2010. The event was held twice a year, once in China and once in South Korea.

Winners

References

External links
Coverage on the Korean Tour's official site 

Korean Tour events
Golf tournaments in South Korea
Recurring sporting events established in 2008
2008 establishments in South Korea